Sicker may refer to:

Arne Sicker, German professional footballer
Mount Sicker,  southern Vancouver Island, British Columbia, Canada
 A track from Babylon (Skindred album)

See also